"Nuttin' for Christmas" (also known as "Nothing for Christmas") is a novelty Christmas song written by Sid Tepper and Roy C. Bennett. It became a hit during the 1955 holiday season when it appeared in Billboard’s pop charts by five other artists. The highest-charting of the five recordings was released by Art Mooney and His Orchestra, with six-year-old Barry Gordon as lead vocalist. This version peaked at No. 6 and became a million-seller.

Summary
The song is sung from the perspective of a boy reciting a long list of his bad deeds, ranging from benign (tearing his pants while climbing a tree, spilling ink on a rug) to mischievous (making a friend eat a bug, hiding a frog in his sister's bed) to felonies (assaulting an acquaintance with a baseball bat to the head, using a counterfeit "penny slug" to buy gum). Because of this rap sheet, the singer has angered his parents, and has been placed on Santa Claus's "naughty list," ensuring he will receive nothing for the holiday, to which the boy is further insulted because he believes some unseen person (most likely one of Santa’s elves) ratted him out for each misdeed. In the end, though he acknowledges "it's too late" to change his fate for this year, he vows to improve his behavior for next year to avoid a repeat and warns the listener not to repeat his mistakes.

Cover versions

Another notable version was performed by Stan Freberg. Freberg's version adds a humorous coda when a man in an outfit resembling Santa Claus's enters through the fireplace and reveals himself to be a robber; the singer directs the robber to the family's valuables, and both join in the closing refrain.

Other charting versions were recorded by the Fontane Sisters, Joe Ward, and Ricky Zahnd and the Blue Jeaners.

The song was revived on the Big Top label by Kenny and Corky and entered the Cashbox Top 100 in 1959.

Other artists who have recorded the song include Less Than Jake, Spike Jones, Eartha Kitt, Homer and Jethro, Relient K, Smash Mouth (featuring Rosie O'Donnell), Sugarland, Tonic Sol-fa, and the Vindictives. 

A cover by Plain White T's was featured in the 2011 Disney Christmas special Prep & Landing: Naughty vs. Nice.

In 2009, the rap artist Tony Yayo sampled the original track on his mixtape The Swine Flu on a track titled "Somebody Snitched On Me" as a "diss" track for the rap artist Rick Ross.

In 2020, ska punk band We Are the Union released a parody of the song, titled “I’m Working Retail for Christmas”.

References

1955 songs
American Christmas songs
Christmas novelty songs
Songs written by Sid Tepper
Songs written by Roy C. Bennett
The Fontane Sisters songs